Jeremy Bloxham FRS is a British geophysicist, and Mallinckrodt Professor of Geophysics, at Harvard University.
He is Dean of Science.

Education
He earned his Ph.D. from the University of Cambridge in 1986.

References

British geophysicists
Alumni of the University of Cambridge
Harvard University faculty
Fellows of Pembroke College, Cambridge
Fellows of the Royal Society
Living people
Place of birth missing (living people)
1960 births